Ghana Bassi was a leader of the Ghana Empire during the time of conquest by the Almoravids. The Almoravids had grown in power while seeking Sahara trade routes. Abu Bakr ibn Umar, while putting down the restive Almoravids in Senegal and the desert areas, sent his troops to conquer the Soninke people, who were ruled by the Ghana empire. Bassi who had good relations with the Muslims, but had refused to convert to Islam and angered the Almoravids, as they wanted to convert other people to their faith. The Berbers started invading the empire after 1050. The Almoravids allied with Takrur, which had converted to Islam with their missionary activities and in 1054 captured Audaghost. After it became clear to Abu Bakr that Yusuf ibn Tashfin had become the supreme leader of the Almoravids, he decided to instead conquer Ghana. Bassi was succeeded in 1062 by Tunka Menin who had refused to convert like Bassi. The empire was destroyed by Almoravids in 1076 but recovered in 1087. Islam which had become dominant religion of the upper class was now being imposed on all its subjects.

References

Almoravid dynasty
Place of birth unknown
Year of birth unknown
Place of death unknown
Year of death unknown
Ghana Empire